František Filipovský (23 September 1907 – 26 October 1993) was a Czechoslovak stage, television, and film actor.

Life and career

Early life and theatre
Filipovský was born on 23 September 1907 in the Czech town of Přelouč, then part of Austria-Hungary. His father was musician František Filipovský Sr., who was 62 by the time his son was born. The young Filipovský was interested in acting from an early age and began performing in theatre in the 1930s, with stints in Emil František Burian's Voice-band, as well as Osvobozené divadlo. Among other engagements, he worked as stage director in Jára Kohout's Divadlo U Nováků in 1939, later moving to Švandovo divadlo, and eventually holding a post at Prague's National Theatre.

Television, film, and dubbing
Throughout his career, Filipovský acted in numerous Czechoslovak films and television productions, as well as lending his voice to various dubbing projects.

Family and death
Filipovský's daughter is actress and singer Pavlína Filipovská. Her daughter, Filipovský's granddaughter, is journalist Pavlína Wolfová. Filipovský died on 26 October 1993 in Prague. He is buried at Olšany Cemetery.

Legacy

 The František Filipovský Awards, named after the actor, are an annual prize for dubbing, held in Filipovský's hometown of Přelouč.
 Filipovského street in Prague's Satalice district is named after the actor.
 A memorial plaque was erected at Filipovský's birth house in Přelouč in 1994.

Selected filmography

Film

Television

References

External links

 

1907 births
1993 deaths
People from Přelouč
People from the Kingdom of Bohemia
20th-century Czech male actors
Czech male film actors
Czech male voice actors
Czechoslovak male voice actors